Pan American Taekwondo Championships or simply Pan Am Taekwondo Championships are the American taekwondo senior championships, first held in 1978 in Mexico City. The event is held every two years by the Pan American Taekwondo Union and it's considered by the World Taekwondo as the continental tournament and a Grade 4 tournament for the world and olympic rankings.

The championships should not be confused with:

 the Pan American Games taekwondo competitions, which form part of a continental multi-sport event in the Olympic tradition.
 the ITF Pan American Taekwondo Championships, a championships organised by the International Taekwondo Federation.

List of tournaments

References 

 
Taekwondo competitions
International sports championships in the Americas
Taekwondo in North America
Taekwondo in South America
Recurring sporting events established in 1978
Biennial sporting events